Sonia Ribes-Beaudemoulin (born 22 November 1953 in Saint-Pierre) is a French biologist and oceanographer. From 1991 to 2019, she was chief curator of the Reunion Island Natural History Museum. She was awarded the National Order of Merit.

She graduated from Pierre and Marie-Curie University, and Aix-Marseille University. In 1990, she was appointed curator of the Natural History Museum of Reunion. She studied marine life in the Indian Ocean, including coral reefs. She organized exhibitions for the museum and Nactus soniae is a species of gecko that was found during one of the expeditions and named after Ribes-Beaudemolin.

Works

Exhibitions 

 Animaux des jardins créoles, en collaboration with François Malbreil (2006)
 Poissons des récifs coralliens, en collaboration with Patrick Durville (2006).
 Les animaux des récifs coralliens (2008)

References 

1953 births
French oceanographers
Living people
French women curators